Chang Jen-chih (born 23 September 1937) is a Taiwanese sailor. He competed in the Dragon event at the 1968 Summer Olympics.

References

External links
 

1937 births
Living people
Taiwanese male sailors (sport)
Olympic sailors of Taiwan
Sailors at the 1968 Summer Olympics – Dragon
Place of birth missing (living people)